Adolph Treidler (1886–1981) was an American artist known for his illustrations, posters, commercial art, and wartime propaganda posters.

His magazine covers and advertisement work appeared in McClure's, Harper's, the Saturday Evening Post, Collier's, Century, Scribner's, and the Woman's Home Companion. He created ads for the Pierce Arrow automobile and for the French Line. His 1930s advertising work for the Bermuda Board of Trade was instrumental in promoting tourism in Bermuda. He was president of the Artist's Guild from 1936-1937.

His wartime propaganda posters in World War I portrayed women workers in munitions plants for the United War Work Campaign.

He also created wartime propaganda posters in World War II. He was Chairman of the Pictorial Publicity Committee for the Society of Illustrators, and " produced at least five posters touting Women Ordnance Workers, otherwise known as WOW’s."

"Treidler was a member of the Art Directors’ Club, The Society of Illustrators, Charter Member of the Artists’ Guild, and life member of the Society of Illustrators. He exhibited at the Whitney Museum in New York in 1923 and The Art Institute of Chicago in 1930." 

Sometime between 1920 and 1925, Adolph joined 241 other bohemians in signing The Greenwich Village Bookshop Door. The door is now held by the Harry Ransom Center at the University of Texas at Austin, and Treidler's signature can be found on front panel 2.

Gallery

References

External links 

Adolph Treidler works at Library of Congress
For Every Fighter a Woman Worker, 1st World War YWCA propaganda poster
The combination that will win the war, poster
Adolph Treidler poster of a bicyclist in Bermuda
Have you bought your bond? Liberty Loan
Robert Treat directing landing of founders of Newark, Adolph Treidler poster

1886 births
1981 deaths
People from Custer County, Colorado
San Francisco Art Institute alumni
American illustrators
American poster artists
20th-century American painters
American male painters
20th-century American male artists